Martin J. Healy (September 16, 1883 – August 30, 1942) was an American politician from New York.

Life 
Healy was born on September 16, 1883 in New York City, New York, the son of Nicholas J. and Ann M. Healy.

Healy attended the common schools, an evening high school, and a business institute. He worked as a bookkeeper, salesman, and accountant. At one point, he worked for the State Board of Education as a certified public accountant.

In 1918, Healy was elected to the New York State Assembly as a Democrat, representing the New York County 19th District. He served in the Assembly in 1919. He lost the 1919 re-election to Republican Marguerite L. Smith. He ran again in the same district in 1920, and again lost to Smith. While serving in the Assembly, he introduced legislation that provided for the construction of the Triborough Bridge and the payment of a state bonus for veterans of World War I. In 1922 and 1924, he was elected to the Board of Aldermen as a representative of the Nineteenth District. From 1925 to 1931, he was the New York City Deputy Commissioner of the Department of Plant and Structures. In 1930, he was accused of selling a magistracy to George F. Ewald for $10,000. There were two resulting trials, both of which ended in the juries disagreeing, and the indictment was quashed. The trials were a by-product of the Seabury investigations into the lower courts. He was also Democratic leader of the 19th Assembly District from 1925 until his retirement in 1935.

Healy was married to Mary C. Klubnik. Their children were Martin J. Jr., Edward F., and William A. J.

Healy died at home on August 30, 1942. He was buried in Gate of Heaven Cemetery.

References

External links 

 The Political Graveyard

1883 births
1942 deaths
Politicians from Manhattan
New York City Council members
American accountants
20th-century American politicians
Democratic Party members of the New York State Assembly
Burials at Gate of Heaven Cemetery (Hawthorne, New York)